The Persian Broadcasting Company (also known as Tapesh طپش or Tapesh Media, LLC; Persian: تپش; English: "heartbeat") was a Persian-language television company based in the United States, launched in October 1989. It was founded by Alireza Amirghassemi and Masoud Jamali, consists of two channels, Tapesh 1 and Tapesh 2; a magazine; and a record company. The Persian Broadcasting Company network was closed in 2009; then reopened under the name PBC Tapesh.

About 
Programming consists of news and talk shows, music concerts, sitcoms, movies, variety shows, sports, entertainment, mini-series, drama, music videos, red carpet events and children's programs. The 24-hour television broadcasts broadcast and produced entertainment, music and sports programs, and were available on the five continents through the satellite and in the United States and Australia via cable. Farsi T2 languages, which are dedicated exclusively to music videos, have a common threading network.

It is broadcast in North America, Europe, North Africa, Australia, New Zealand, Far East, and the Middle East, and is the only Persian channel in New Zealand and Australia. The company's world headquarters and production facilities are located in Los Angeles, California with satellite offices in New York, Vancouver, London, Dubai, Kuala Lumpur and Sydney.

Owner changed 
Owner of tapesh ( persian broadcasting company ) changed to Alireza Amirghassemi .

See also 
 Iranian Americans

References 
Tapesh on IMDB

External links 

Iranian-American culture in California
Persian-language television stations
Companies based in Los Angeles
Television channels and stations established in 1989